WJPP-LP (100.1 FM) is a radio station licensed to Palm City, Florida, United States. The station is currently owned by Prince of Peace Communications, Inc.

References

External links
 

JPP-LP
JPP-LP